Rip It Off is the fourth studio album from San Francisco, California, United States, alternative rock band Stroke 9. It was released on October 1, 2002. The album's singles were "Latest Disaster", "Kick Some Ass", and "100 Girls". "Kick Some Ass" appeared in the 2001 film Jay and Silent Bob Strike Back, and the music video for the song features the title characters Jay and Silent Bob attacking random fictional singers and rappers. The song "Just Can't Wait" was also included on the album "Chelsea Mix" which was released to promote the My Scene dolls. "Do It Again" was featured in season three, episode three of the American TV show Scrubs.

Track listing
 "Latest Disaster"
 "100 Girls"
 "Vacuum Bag"
 "Kick Some Ass"
 "Don't Worry"
 "Do It Again"
 "Just Can't Wait"
 "We Were Wrong"
 "Reject"
 "Anywhere"
 "Lead The Way"
 "California"

References

Stroke 9 albums
2002 albums
Albums produced by David Kahne
Albums produced by John Shanks
Albums produced by Butch Walker
Albums produced by Jerry Harrison